George Shepherd may refer to:

 George Shepherd (hurdler) (1938–2022), Canadian Olympic hurdler
 George Shepherd (rugby league), rugby league footballer who played in the 1960s
 George Shepherd (artist) (1784–1862), British draughtsman and watercolour painter
 George Shepherd, 1st Baron Shepherd (1881–1954), British Labour politician